Lewis John Christon (born 24 January 1989 in Milton Keynes, Buckinghamshire) is an English professional footballer who plays as a defender without a club.

Christon was a highly rated graduate of Wycombe Wanderers's youth academy and signed his first professional contract in the summer of 2006. He spent the end of the 2007–08 season on loan at AFC Wimbledon. He was released by the club by mutual consent on 5 January 2009.

References

External links

Official Wycombe Profile

1989 births
Living people
People from Milton Keynes
English footballers
Association football defenders
Wycombe Wanderers F.C. players
Woking F.C. players
AFC Wimbledon players
Basingstoke Town F.C. players
Oxford City F.C. players
English Football League players
National League (English football) players
Footballers from Buckinghamshire